William or Bill Leonard may refer to:

Government
William Leonard (English politician) (fl. 1597), MP for Dover
William Leonard (Scottish politician) (1887–1969), MP for Glasgow St. Rollox, 1931–1950
J. William Leonard, director of the Information Security Oversight Office
Bill Leonard (politician) (born 1947), American politician in California
Billy Leonard (born 1955), Irish republican politician

Military
William Leonard (Medal of Honor), Medal of Honor recipient during the Plains Indian Wars
William E. Leonard (1836–1891), Medal of Honor recipient in the American Civil War
William F. Leonard (1913–1985), recipient of the Medal of Honor
William N. Leonard (1916–2005), American World War II flying ace and United States Navy admiral

Others
William Andrew Leonard (1848–1930), American author and prelate of the Episcopal Church
William Ellery Leonard (1876–1944), American poet
William J. Leonard (1927–2006), American football player
William Robert Leonard or Bobby Leonard (1932–2021), American basketball player and coach
Bill Leonard (journalist) (1916–1994), American broadcast journalist
Bill J. Leonard (born 1946), American historian of religion